The San Diego Toreros men's soccer program represents the University of San Diego in all NCAA Division I men's college soccer competitions. Founded in 1980, the Toreros compete in the West Coast Conference. The Toreros are coached by Brian Quinn. USD plays their home matches at Torero Stadium.

Team honors

Conference regular season championships 
USD has won nine WCC regular season championships.

Coaching records

Seasons

NCAA Tournament history 
USD has appeared in 14 NCAA Tournaments, including one College Cup appearance. Their most recent performance came in 2014. Their combined NCAA record is 13–14–1.

References

External links 
 USD Men's Soccer

 
Sports teams in San Diego
Association football clubs established in 1980